The women's long jump event at the 2006 World Junior Championships in Athletics was held in Beijing, China, at Chaoyang Sports Centre on 17 and 19 August.

Medalists

Results

Final
19 August

Qualifications
17 August

Group A

Group B

Participation
According to an unofficial count, 30 athletes from 25 countries participated in the event.

References

Long jump
Long jump at the World Athletics U20 Championships